South Kensington railway station is located on the Werribee and Williamstown lines in Victoria, Australia. It serves the inner north-western Melbourne suburb of Kensington, and opened on 11 March 1891.

Freight lines run to the south of the station. The closest of those lines are used by V/Line to reverse empty trains from Traralgon and Bairnsdale services, while the tracks further south are used by a variety of standard gauge freight operators. The lines to the east join Melbourne Yard, while those to the west are the South Kensington–West Footscray set of lines that lead to either South Dynon or West Footscray, via the Bunbury Street tunnel.

All the private sidings that formerly existed around South Kensington have now been closed. They included a siding to a large wool store to the north-east (now demolished), one to a warehouse and silos to the east (open but no longer served by rail), and two sidings to the north serving the Melbourne City Council abattoirs and Kenstore, a military warehouse complex that opened during World War II.

In 1972, the platforms were extended at the down end of the station. In 1975, the present platform shelters were provided, when the station was modified to accommodate the quadruplication of the line to Footscray. The disused station office, located near the entrance to the underpass on Childers Street, was also provided around that time. On 1 July of that year, parcel facilities at the station were abolished. The following year, in November 1976, the quadruplicated line between South Kensington and Footscray was opened.

The current configuration of the station dates from 2014, as part of the Regional Rail Link (RRL) project. The goods-only tracks immediately to the south of the station were replaced by a pair of tracks used by regional passenger services operating to and from Southern Cross. The signal box, formerly located at the up end of the down platform (Platform 2), was demolished to make way for the new RRL tracks. A mural outside the station on Childers Street was funded by the City–Maribyrnong River arm of the project, but it has since been painted over.

In 2020, in a survey conducted by the RACV, South Kensington was ranked as the worst railway station in Victoria.

Platforms and services
South Kensington has two side platforms. It is served by Werribee and Williamstown trains.

Platform 1:
  all stations services to Flinders Street and Frankston
  all stations services to Flinders Street and Frankston

Platform 2:
  all stations services to Laverton via Altona (weekdays only); all stations services to Werribee
  all stations services to Williamstown

South Kensington was also served by Sunbury line trains until 2013.

References

Railway stations in Melbourne
Railway stations in Australia opened in 1891
Railway stations in the City of Melbourne (LGA)